"Forest of the Dead" is the ninth episode of the fourth series of the British science fiction television series Doctor Who. It was first broadcast by BBC One on 7 June 2008. It is the second of a two-part story; the first part, "Silence in the Library", aired on 31 May.

In the episode, the time-travelling temp Donna Noble (Catherine Tate) is trapped inside a virtual reality in a planet-sized library's hard drive in the 51st century and has false memories implanted of a married life. At the same time, another time traveller, the Tenth Doctor (David Tennant), seeks to rescue Donna, and thousands of other humans saved inside the library hard drive while being pursued by the microscopic swarm called Vashta Nerada. The episode also features the death of River Song (Alex Kingston), an archaeologist who has a close relationship with the Doctor, but because of the non-linearity of this partnership, the Doctor in the episode has only just met River.

Plot
The Tenth Doctor, River, Strackman Lux, and the remainder of their team flee the microscopic Vashta Nerada on a planet-sized Library. Other team members are consumed by the Vashta Nerada, their space suits animated by the swarms. During a respite, Lux explains that the Library was constructed by his grandfather for Lux's aunt, Charlotte, who was diagnosed with an incurable disease at a young age. Lux's grandfather had a giant computer constructed at the core of the Library to allow Charlotte's mind to live on among the collected works of humankind. The Doctor realises Charlotte's mind is struggling to cope after "saving" the thousands of patrons by transferring their physical forms to the computer core 100 years ago when the Vashta Nerada attacked.

Within the simulation of a contemporary Earth village, Donna is tended to by Dr Moon (an avatar of the virus checker program) and introduced to Lee, whom she marries. Aware that time is skipping, Donna is alerted by Miss Evangelista, one of River's team members killed by the Vashta Nerada, that she is in a simulation.

In the core, the Doctor learns from the Vashta Nerada their forests were used to create the books of the Library. They now claim the Library as their own. The Vashta Nerada allow the Doctor one day to free the people trapped in the computer core, including Donna, after which the Library will belong to them. The Doctor prepares to hook himself to the computer terminal, aware this will likely kill him. River knocks him out and takes his place, insisting that the Doctor's death now would prevent her meeting him in her own past.

The patrons stored inside the computer rematerialise on the Library surface, where they teleport away to safety. Lee is unable to call out to Donna as he leaves. As the Doctor and Donna leave behind River's diary and sonic screwdriver, the Doctor wonders why his future self would give River his screwdriver. He finds a data recorder inside the mechanism which has preserved River's thought pattern. The Doctor saves her pattern to the core. River wakes up in the Earth simulation and is greeted by Charlotte and River's team members who had fallen victim to the Vashta Nerada. Charlotte assures her that the simulation is now a "good place" where she will be safe as the Doctor fixed the data core.

Continuity
According to Steven Moffat, the squareness gun used by Professor River Song to help the party escape from the Vashta Nerada at the beginning of the episode is intended to be the same sonic blaster that was used by Jack Harkness in the episode "The Doctor Dances". Moffat suggests that it was left in the TARDIS after "The Parting of the Ways", and taken by River Song in the Doctor's future. The name "squareness gun" was coined by Rose Tyler in the earlier episode.

Production

Writing
"Forest of the Dead" was initially announced under the title "River's Run", before its name was changed relatively late in production. Josh and Ella, Donna's two children in the computer-generated world, were named after Steven Moffat's son and his son's friend.

Casting
For the role of River Song, whom producer Russell T Davies describes as "sort of the Doctor's wife", the production sought to cast Kate Winslet. One of Winslet's first acting roles was in the BBC teen drama Dark Season, written by Davies. The role of River Song eventually went to Alex Kingston, about whom Davies said, "I bloody love her!"

The role of Strackman Lux went to Steve Pemberton, who is best known for his work as a member of The League of Gentlemen. He also appeared in Blackpool with David Tennant.

Filming
Several scenes from this episode and "Silence in the Library" were filmed at Swansea's Brangwyn Hall. These include the library reception area where the TARDIS arrives, and the staircase where the Doctor and Donna look out over the empty library. The climactic scenes of the episode (in the library core) were filmed in an electrical substation of a disused Alcoa factory in Waunarlwydd, Swansea. Other scenes were filmed at the Old Swansea Central Library.

Scenes set in CAL's databanks were filmed at Dyffryn Gardens, St Nicholas.

The wedding dress Catherine Tate wears in this episode is the same dress she wore in "The Runaway Bride".

Reception
Forest of the Dead was watched by 7.84 million viewers, giving it a 40% audience share; the highest in Series Four and the highest in its timeslot. The episode received an Appreciation Index score of 89 (considered "Excellent"), one of the highest figures the new series had received to date, alongside "The Parting of the Ways", "Doomsday" and the preceding episode "Silence in the Library".

This episode, along with "Silence in the Library", was nominated for a Hugo Award in the Best Dramatic Presentation, Short Form category.

See also
Simulated reality

References

External links

2008 British television episodes
Television episodes written by Steven Moffat
Tenth Doctor episodes
Fiction set in the 6th millennium
Works set in libraries